The Costs of War Project is a nonpartisan research project based at the Watson Institute for International and Public Affairs at Brown University that seeks to document the direct and indirect human and financial costs of U.S. wars in Iraq and Afghanistan and related counterterrorism efforts. The project is the most extensive and comprehensive public accounting of the cost of post-September 11th U.S. military operations compiled to date.

The project involves economists, anthropologists, lawyers, humanitarians, and political scientists. It is directed by Catherine Lutz and Stephanie Savell of Brown and Neta Crawford of Boston University.

History 
The Costs of War Project was established in 2010 by professor of anthropology and international studies at Brown University, Catherine Lutz, and Chair of Political Science at Boston University, Neta Crawford.

The project released its first findings in June 2011 and has published continuously since. It is financial supported by the Carnegie Corporation of New York, Colombe Foundation, and Open Society Foundations.

Between 2016 and 2018, U.S. President Donald Trump repeatedly cited the expected total costs of the War on Terror through 2050 as calculated by the project, though misrepresented the amount as cumulative spending rather than cumulative and potential future spending. On August 31, 2021, the project's figures for the financial cost of the War in Afghanistan were cited by U.S. President Joe Biden in a speech defending the withdrawal of U.S. troops from the nation.

Costs of War is the 2022 recipient of the US Peace Prize "For crucial research to shed light on the human, environmental, economic, social, and political costs of U.S. wars."

Contributors 
Contributors to the project include Steven Aftergood, Nadje Al-Ali, Andrew Bacevich, Catherine L. Besteman, Linda Bilmes, Cynthia Enloe, Lisa Graves, Hugh Gusterson, William D. Hartung, James Heintz, Dahr Jamail, Jessica Stern, and Winslow T. Wheeler.

Calculations 
In their most recent calculations, the Costs of War Project estimates that post-9/11 wars participated in by the US have exceeded $8 trillion and directly killed 897,000 to 929,000 people in Iraq, Afghanistan, Pakistan, Syria, and Yemen. This figure includes $2.2 trillion reserved for veterans' care through 2050.

A 2021 report from the project concluded that since September 11, 2001, four times more U.S. veterans and service members had died by suicide than had been killed in combat.

Scope 
In its scope, the project accounts for factors official estimates often exclude, including interest expenses, medical care for veterans, and spending by departments other than the Department of Defense. The study does not include U.S. assistance for operations against ISIS affiliates in the Philippines, Africa or Europe. In 2018, the project revised its focus to include Africa, accounting for U.S. operations and drone strikes in Libya and the Horn of Africa.

References

External links 

 Official website

See also 

 Financial cost of the Iraq War
Casualties of the Iraq War
 Cost of conflict

Military economics
Brown University
Military history of the United States
People killed in the War on Terror